The FIDE Grand Prix 2017 was a series of four chess tournaments that formed part of the qualification cycle for the World Chess Championship 2018. The top two finishers, Shakhriyar Mamedyarov and Alexander Grischuk, qualified to the 2018 Candidates Tournament.

Format
There were four tournaments in the cycle; each consisted of 18 players. 24 players were selected to compete in the tournaments, and each player competed in three of the four tournaments.

In contrast to the previous editions where players played a full round-robin, each tournament was an 18-player, nine-round Swiss system tournament. In each round players scored 1 point for a win, ½ point for a draw and 0 for a loss. Grand Prix points were then allocated according to each player's standing in the tournament, as shown in the table below.

Players
The Grand Prix consists of 24 players. Two players qualified to be among the 24 by being finalists in the World Chess Championship 2016 match; four players qualified by reaching the semifinals of the Chess World Cup 2015, eight players will qualify based on their ratings; one player will qualify by participation in the Association of Chess Professionals, and finally nine players rated at least 2700  (or 2600 for former men and women national or world champions) will be nominated by Agon and FIDE.

In an interview with Chessdom (Aug 2016), Zurab Azmaiparashvili (president of the European Chess Union) indicated various plusses and minuses with the new system, particularly that the nine "wild card" entries were less expensive than in previous versions. However, with few details currently available and maybe questions unanswered, he also was unsure of the professionality of Agon's approach.

At the FIDE General Assembly in September, Agon presented Vladimir Kramnik as having Russia as a national sponsor, which if true would have been the first time that he participated in the FIDE Grand Prix.

Any player who declines to participate in the Grand Prix will be replaced by another player who is rated over 2700. Players who held an entry spot but did not enter the Grand Prix were: Magnus Carlsen and Sergey Karjakin from the World Chess Championship 2016, Fabiano Caruana, Viswanathan Anand, Veselin Topalov, Vladimir Kramnik, Wesley So from the rating list.

Prize money and Grand Prix points
The total prize money is €130,000 per single Grand Prix, or €520,000 for the total Grand Prix series. This money is allocated based on ranking in each individual tournament.

Additionally, each player who can recruit a sponsor will receive €20,000.

Tie breaks
With the objective of determining qualifiers to play in the Candidates 2018, and in the case that two or more players have equal cumulative points at the top, the following criteria were utilized to decide the overall Series winner and other overall placings:
 Number of actual game result points scored in the three tournaments entered.
 Number of games played with black.
 Number of wins.
 Number of black wins.
 Drawing of lots.

Schedule

Originally the first event was to take place in October 2016, but this has been moved to November 2017, with the other dates mostly the same.

Originally the 3rd Grand Prix (now the 2nd) was to conflict with the World Team Chess Championship, but now that event has been moved to July where it instead conflicts with the Grand Chess Tour events and Norway Chess.

Broadcasting boycott
FIDE Grand Prix broadcasting right belongs to Agon, which, in previous tournaments, had sued other websites to restrict their rights on relaying chess moves. In protest, chess24 refuses to relay or mention the Grand Prix starting from Moscow 2017.

Events crosstables

The notation in the crosstable is the number of the opponent, color of pieces, and score. For example, in the top-left hand corner of the Sharjah 2017 crosstable, 16w½ indicates that in round 1, Grischuk played player 16 (Jon Ludvig Hammer) with the white pieces, and the game ended in a draw. The player numbers do not exactly correspond to finishing position; for instance Grischuk, Vachier-Lagrave and Mamedyarov all finished equal first, but are allocated numbers 1, 2 and 3 for convenience of notation.

Sharjah 2017
{| class="wikitable"
|+ 1st stage, Sharjah, UAE, 18–27 February 2017
! !! Player !! Rating !! 1 !! 2 !! 3 !! 4 !! 5 !! 6 !! 7 !! 8 !! 9 !! Total !!  !! Blacks !! Wins !!  !! TPR !! GP 
|- style="background:#ccffcc;"
|-
| 1 || align=left |  || 2742
| 16w½ || 6b½ || 13w½ || 8b½ || 10w1 || 7b½ || 5w½ || 3w1 || 2b½ || 5½ || +11 || 4 || 2 || 0 || 2828 || 140
|-
| 2 || align=left |  || 2796
| 11w1 || 9b1 || 3w½ || 7b½ || 13w½ || 5b½ || 6w½ || 8b½ || 1w½ || 5½ || +4 || 4 || 2 || 1 || 2824 || 140
|-
| 3 || align=left |  || 2766
| 12b½ || 17w1 || 2b½ || 5w1 || 7w½ || 6b½ || 8w½ || 1b0 || 14w1 || 5½ || +6 || 4 || 3 || 0 || 2814 || 140
|-
| 4 || align=left |  || 2760
| 9w0 || 15b1 || 16w½ || 6b½ || 8w½ || 14b½ || 7w½ || 11b½ || 13w1 || 5 || -2 || 4 || 2 || 1 || 2751 || 70
|-
| 5 || align=left |  || 2751
| 15w1 || 13b½ || 10w½ || 3b0 || 16w1 || 2w½ || 1b½ || 6b½ || 7b½ || 5 || +3 || 5 || 2 || 0 || 2779 || 70
|-
| 6 || align=left |  || 2709
| 7b½ || 1w½ || 14b½ || 4w½ || 18b1 || 3w½ || 2b½ || 5w½ || 8w½ || 5 || +9 || 4 || 1 || 1 || 2784 || 70
|-
| 7 || align=left |  || 2785
| 6w½ || 16b½ || 9w1 || 2w½ || 3b½ || 1w½ || 4b½ || 13b½ || 5w½ || 5 || -1 || 4 || 1 || 0 || 2780 || 70
|-
| 8 || align=left |  || 2749
| 14b½ || 18w½ || 12b½ || 1w½ || 4b½ || 11w1 || 3b½ || 2w½ || 6b½ || 5 || +2 || 5 || 1 || 0 || 2768 || 70
|-
| 9 || align=left |  || 2692
| 4b1 || 2w0 || 7b0 || 15w½ || 17b½ || 18w1 || 13w½ || 14b½ || 11w½ || 4½ || +4 || 4 || 2 || 1 || 2726 || 25
|-
| 10 || align=left |  || 2759
| 18b½ || 12w½ || 5b½ || 14w½ || 1b0 || 17w½ || 11b0 || 16b1 || 15w1 || 4½ || -8 || 5 || 2 || 1 || 2693 || 25
|-
| 11 || align=left |  || 2720
| 2b0 || 14w½ || 18b½ || 17w1 || 12b½ || 8b0 || 10w1 || 4w½ || 9b½ || 4½ || +0 || 5 || 2 || 0 || 2722 || 25
|-
| 12 || align=left |  || 2709
| 3w½ || 10b½ || 8w½ || 16b½ || 11w½ || 13b½ || 14w½ || 15b½ || 17w½ || 4½ || +1 || 4 || 0 || 0 || 2714 || 25
|-
| 13 || align=left |  || 2785
| 17b½ || 5w½ || 1b½ || 18w½ || 2b½ || 12w½ || 9b½ || 7w½ || 4b0 || 4 || -11 || 5 || 0 || 0 || 2692 || 7
|-
| 14 || align=left |  || 2651
| 8w½ || 11b½ || 6w½ || 10b½ || 15b½ || 4w½ || 12b½ || 9w½ || 3b0 || 4 || +4 || 5 || 0 || 0 || 2681 || 7
|-
| 15|| align=left |  || 2656
| 5b0 || 4w0 || 17b½ || 9b½ || 14w½ || 16b½ || 18w1 || 12w½ || 10b0 || 3½ || -4 || 5 || 1 || 0 || 2624 || 3
|-
| 16 || align=left |  || 2628
| 1b½ || 7w½ || 4b½ || 12w½ || 5b0 || 15w½ || 17b½ || 10w0 || 18b½ || 3½ || +2 || 5 || 0 || 0 || 2647 || 3
|-
| 17 || align=left |  || 2711
| 13w½ || 3b0 || 15w½ || 11b0 || 9w½ || 10b½ || 16w½ || 18b½ || 12b½ || 3½ || -10 || 5 || 0 || 0 || 2630 || 3
|-
| 18 || align=left |  || 2671
| 10w½ || 8b½ || 11w½ || 13b½ || 6w0 || 9b0 || 15b0 || 17w½ || 16w½ || 3 || -10 || 4 || 0 || 0 || 2587 || 1
|}

Moscow 2017
{| class="wikitable"
|+ 2nd stage, Moscow, Russia, 12–21 May 2017
! !! Player !! Rating !! 1 !! 2 !! 3 !! 4 !! 5 !! 6 !! 7 !! 8 !! 9 !! Total !!  !! Blacks !! Wins !!  !! TPR !! GP 
|- style="background:#ccffcc;"
|-
| 1 || align=left |  || 2773
| 4b½ || 18w1 || 3b1 || 5w½ || 2b½ || 8w½ || 7b½ || 9w½ || 10b1 || 6 || +12 || 5 || 3 || 2 || 2870 || 170
|-
| 2 || align=left |  || 2772
| 14w½ || 10b½ || 17w1 || 16b1 || 1w½ || 4b½ || 6w½ || 5b½ || 8w½ || 5½ || +5 || 4 || 2 || 1 || 2813 || 140
|-
| 3 || align=left |  || 2652
| 15b1 || 8w½ || 1w0 || 7b½ || 6w0 || 16b½ || 13w1 || 14w½ || 18b1 || 5 || +14 || 4 || 3 || 2 || 2770 || 71 
|-
| 4 || align=left |  || 2710
| 1w½ || 7b½ || 6w½ || 14b1 || 5b½ || 2w½ || 8b½ || 10w½ || 12b½ || 5 || +11 || 5 || 1 || 1 || 2800 || 71 
|-
| 5 || align=left |  || 2755
| 11b½ || 16w½ || 12b1 || 1b½ || 4w½ || 6b½ || 10w½ || 2w½ || 7b½ || 5 || +2 || 5 || 1 || 1 || 2776 || 71 
|-
| 6 || align=left |  || 2750
| 16b½ || 11w½ || 4b½ || 8w½ || 3b1 || 5w½ || 2b½ || 7w½ || 9b½ || 5 || +3 || 5 || 1 || 1 || 2775 || 71 
|-
| 7 || align=left |  || 2786
| 18b½ || 4w½ || 11b½ || 3w½ || 9b½ || 15w1 || 1w½ || 6b½ || 5w½ || 5 || -1 || 4 || 1 || 0 || 2776 || 71 
|-
| 8 || align=left |  || 2795
| 17w½ || 3b½ || 10w½ || 6b½ || 16w1 || 1b½ || 4w½ || 11b½ || 2b½ || 5 || -5 || 5 || 1 || 0 || 2760 || 71 
|-
| 9 || align=left |  || 2785
| 10w½ || 17b½ || 14w½ || 13b½ || 7w½ || 11b½ || 16w1 || 1b½ || 6w½ || 5 || -3 || 4 || 1 || 0 || 2759 || 71 
|-
| 10 || align=left |  || 2724
| 9b½ || 2w½ || 8b½ || 11w½ || 15b½ || 12w1 || 5b½ || 4b½ || 1w0 || 4½ || +4 || 5 || 1 || 0 || 2754 || 20
|-
| 11 || align=left |  || 2696
| 5w½ || 6b½ || 7w½ || 10b½ || 13w½ || 9w½ || 12b½ || 8w½ || 17b½ || 4½ || +6 || 4 || 0 || 0 || 2746 || 20
|-
| 12 || align=left |  || 2750
| 13w½ || 14b½ || 5w0 || 18b½ || 17w1 || 10b0 || 11w½ || 15b1 || 4w½ || 4½ || -4 || 4 || 2 || 1 || 2716 || 20
|-
| 13 || align=left |  || 2621
| 12b½ || 15w0 || 18b1 || 9w½ || 11b½ || 14w½ || 3b0 || 17w½ || 16b½ || 4 || +7 || 5 || 1 || 1 || 2674 || 7
|-
| 14 || align=left |  || 2710
| 2b½ || 12w½ || 9b½ || 4w0 || 18w½ || 13b½ || 17w½ || 3b½ || 15w½ || 4 || -3 || 4 || 0 || 0 || 2681 || 7
|-
| 15|| align=left |  || 2751
| 3w0 || 13b1 || 16w0 || 17b1 || 10w½ || 7b0 || 18b½ || 12w0 || 14b½ || 3½ || -16 || 5 || 2 || 2 || 2626 || 3
|-
| 16 || align=left |  || 2633
| 6w½ || 5b½ || 15b1 || 2w0 || 8b0 || 3w½ || 9b0 || 18w½ || 13w½ || 3½ || +2 || 4 || 1 || 1 || 2654 || 3
|-
| 17 || align=left |  || 2747
| 8b½ || 9w½ || 2b0 || 15w0 || 12b0 || 18w1 || 14b½ || 13b½ || 11w½ || 3½ || -12 || 5 || 1 || 0 || 2654 || 3
|-
| 18 || align=left |  || 2727
| 7w½ || 1b0 || 13w0 || 12w½ || 14b½ || 17b0 || 15w½ || 16b½ || 3w0 || 2½ || -22 || 4 || 0 || 0 || 2548 || 1
|}

Geneva 2017
{| class="wikitable"
|+ 3rd stage, Geneva, Switzerland, 6–15 July 2017
! !! Player !! Rating !! 1 !! 2 !! 3 !! 4 !! 5 !! 6 !! 7 !! 8 !! 9 !! Total !!  !! Blacks !! Wins !!  !! TPR !! GP 
|- style="background:#ccffcc;"
|-
| 1 || align=left |  || 2724
| 5b1 || 11w1 || 12b½ || 4w½ || 10b½ || 3b½ || 9w1 || 6w½ || 2b½ || 6 || +18 || 5 || 3 || 1 || 2877 || 170
|-
| 2 || align=left |  || 2742
| 16b½ || 14w½ || 11b0 || 17w1 || 4b½ || 15w1 || 10b½ || 12w1 || 1w½ || 5½ || +9 || 4 || 3 || 0 || 2814 || 125
|-
| 3 || align=left |  || 2761
| 15b½ || 16w1 || 7b½ || 12w½ || 11b1 || 1w½ || 4b½ || 10w½ || 5b½ || 5½ || +8 || 5 || 2 || 1 || 2827 || 125
|-
| 4 || align=left |  || 2737
| 6b1 || 7w½ || 10w½ || 1b½ || 2w½ || 12b1 || 3w½ || 8b0 || 13w½ || 5 || +6 || 4 || 2 || 2 || 2783 || 60
|-
| 5 || align=left |  || 2775
| 1w0 || 18b1 || 8w½ || 14b½ || 6w½ || 13b½ || 12w½ || 17b1 || 3w½ || 5 || -3 || 4 || 2 || 2 || 2756 || 60
|-
| 6 || align=left |  || 2654
| 4w0 || 17b½ || 18w½ || 15w½ || 5b½ || 16b1 || 8w1 || 1b½ || 7w½ || 5 || +12 || 4 || 2 || 1 || 2755 || 60
|-
| 7 || align=left |  || 2736
| 18w1 || 4b½ || 3w½ || 9b0 || 8w½ || 14b½ || 13w½ || 16b1 || 6b½ || 5 || +2 || 5 || 2 || 1 || 2754 || 60
|-
| 8 || align=left |  || 2735
| 12b½ || 9w½ || 5b½ || 13w½ || 7b½ || 11w1 || 6b0 || 4w1 || 10b½ || 5 || +6 || 5 || 2 || 0 || 2788 || 60
|-
| 9 || align=left |  || 2749
| 13w½ || 8b½ || 14w½ || 7w1 || 12b½ || 10w½ || 1b0 || 18b½ || 17w1 || 5 || +2 || 5 || 2 || 0 || 2770 || 60
|-
| 10 || align=left |  || 2800
| 14b½ || 15w1 || 4b½ || 11w½ || 1w½ || 9b½ || 2w½ || 3b½ || 8w½ || 5 || -3 || 4 || 1 || 0 || 2779 || 60
|-
| 11 || align=left |  || 2739
| 17w1 || 1b0 || 2w1 || 10b½ || 3w0 || 8b0 || 18w1 || 14b½ || 16w½ || 4½ || -2 || 4 || 3 || 0 || 2721 || 11
|-
| 12 || align=left |  || 2809
| 8w½ || 13b1 || 1w½ || 3b½ || 9w½ || 4w0 || 5b½ || 2b0 || 18w1 || 4½ || -10 || 4 || 2 || 1 || 2729 || 11
|-
| 13 || align=left |  || 2703
| 9b½ || 12w0 || 16b1 || 8b½ || 14w½ || 5w½ || 7b½ || 15w½ || 4b½ || 4½ || +5 || 5 || 1 || 1 || 2741 || 11
|-
| 14 || align=left |  || 2728
| 10w½ || 2b½ || 9b½ || 5w½ || 13b½ || 7w½ || 17b½ || 11w½ || 15b½ || 4½ || +1 || 5 || 0 || 0 || 2735 || 11
|-
| 15 || align=left |  || 2707
| 3w½ || 10b0 || 17w½ || 6b½ || 18w1 || 2b0 || 16w½ || 13b½ || 14w½ || 4 || -5 || 4 || 1 || 0 || 2667 || 4
|-
| 16 || align=left |  || 2694
| 2w½ || 3b0 || 13w0 || 18b0 || 17b1 || 6w0 || 15b½ || 7w0 || 11b½ || 2½ || -19 || 5 || 1 || 1 || 2539 || 2
|-
| 17 || align=left |  || 2666
| 11b0 || 6w½ || 15b½ || 2b0 || 16w0 || 18b1 || 14w½ || 5w0 || 9b0 || 2½ || -14 || 4 || 1 || 1 || 2548 || 2
|-
| 18 || align=left |  || 2638
| 7b0 || 5w0 || 6b½ || 16w1 || 15b0 || 17w0 || 11b0 || 9w½ || 12b0 || 2 || -14 || 5 || 1 || 0 || 2505 || 1
|}

Palma 2017

Going into the final tournament, only Radjabov and Vachier-Lagrave could overtake Mamedyarov or Grischuk to qualify for the Candidates. (Ding Liren could also finish first or second in the Grand Prix, but had already qualified via the World Cup). Going into the final round of that tournament, both Radjabov and Vachier-Lagrave were equal 2nd-10th, and both would have qualified for the Candidates with a final round win, though neither was able to.

{| class="wikitable sortable"
|+ 4th stage, Palma de Mallorca, Spain, 16–27 November 2017
! !! Player !! Rating !! 1 !! 2 !! 3 !! 4 !! 5 !! 6 !! 7 !! 8 !! 9 !! Total !!  !! Blacks !! Wins !!  !! TPR !! GP 
|- style="background:#ccffcc;"
|-
| 1 || align=left |  || 2801
| 2b½ || 12w1 || 10b½ || 13w1 || 4b½ || 5w½ || 9b½ || 8w½ || 3b½ || 5½ ||  || 5 || 2 || 0 ||  || 155
|-
| 2 || align=left |  || 2721
| 1w½ || 3b½ || 16w½ || 11b1 || 5w½ || 13b½ || 7w½ || 9b½ || 10b1 || 5½ ||  || 5 || 2 || 2 ||  || 155
|-
| 3 || align=left |  || 2780
| 11b½ || 2w½ || 8b½ || 6w1 || 10b½ || 4w½ || 5b½ || 7w½ || 1w½ || 5 ||  || 4 || 1 || 0 ||  || 71
|-
| 4 || align=left |  || 2774
| 15w½ || 16b½ || 11w½ || 12b1 || 1w½ || 3b½ || 13w½ || 5b½ || 8b½ || 5 ||  || 5 || 1 || 1 ||  || 71
|-
| 5 || align=left |  || 2763
| 8b½ || 11w½ || 18b1 || 10w½ || 2b½ || 1b½ || 3w½ || 4w½ || 7b½ || 5 ||  || 5 || 1 || 1 ||  || 71
|-
| 6 || align=left |  || 2741
| 16w½ || 15b1 || 13w½ || 3b0 || 7w½ || 8b0 || 14w1 || 17b1 || 9w½ || 5 ||  || 4 || 3 || 2 ||  || 71
|-
| 7 || align=left |  || 2738
| 18b½ || 8w½ || 12b½ || 15w1 || 6b½ || 10w½ || 2b½ || 3b½ || 5w½ || 5 ||  || 5 || 1 || 0 ||  || 71
|-
| 8 || align=left |  || 2702
| 5w½ || 7b½ || 3w½ || 16b½ || 9w½ || 6w1 || 10b½ || 1b½ || 4w½ || 5 ||  || 4 || 1 || 0 ||  || 71
|-
| 9 || align=left |  || 2692
| 13b0 || 17b½ || 14w½ || 18w1 || 8b½ || 16b1 || 1w½ || 2w½ || 6b½ || 5 ||  || 5 || 2 || 1 ||  || 71
|-
| 10 || align=left |  || 2796
| 17w1 || 13b½ || 1w½ || 5b½ || 3w½ || 7b½ || 8w½ || 12b½ || 2w0 || 4½ ||  || 4 || 1 || 0 ||  || 20
|-
| 11 || align=left |  || 2707
| ½ || ½ || ½ || 0 || ½ || ½ || 1 || ½ || ½ || 4½ ||  || 4 || 1 || 0 ||  || 20
|-
| 12 || align=left |  || 2683
| 1 || 0 || ½ || 0 || ½ || 1 || ½ || ½ || ½ || 4½ ||  || 4 || 2 || 1 ||  || 20
|-
| 13 || align=left |  || 2762
| 1 || ½ || ½ || 0 || ½ || ½ || ½ || 0 || ½ || 4 ||  || 4 || 1 || 0 ||  || 6
|-
| 14 || align=left |  || 2741
| 0 || ½ || ½ || ½ || ½ || ½ || 0 || 1 || ½ || 4 ||  || 5 || 1 || 0 ||  || 6
|-
| 15 || align=left |  || 2705
| ½ || 0 || 1 || 0 || ½ || ½ || ½ || ½ || ½ || 4 ||  || 5 || 1 || 0 ||  || 6
|-
| 16 || align=left |  || 2651
| ½ || ½ || ½ || ½ || ½ || 0 || 0 || ½ || ½ || 3½ ||  || 4 || 0 || 0 ||  || 3
|-
| 17 || align=left |  || 2719
| 0 || ½ || 0 || ½ || ½ || 0 || 1 || 0 || ½ || 3 ||  || 5 || 1 || 1 ||  || 1
|-
| 18 || align=left |  || 2629
| ½ || ½ || 0 || 0 || ½ || ½ || 0 || ½ || ½ || 3 ||  || 4 || 0 || 0 ||  || 1
|}

Grand Prix standings
Grand Prix points in bold indicate a tournament win. Green indicates qualifiers for the 2018 Candidates Tournament. Mamedyarov and Grischuk qualified via the Grand Prix. Ding Liren and Aronian qualified via the Chess World Cup 2017.

 Wei Yi was replaced by Hou Yifan.

References

External links
 FIDE World Chess Grand Prix 2017 , (official site), FIDE

FIDE Grand Prix
2017 in chess